Giorgio Emo (1644–1705) was a Roman Catholic prelate who served as Archbishop of Corfu (1688–1705).

Biography
Giorgio Emo was born in Venice, Italy on 23 June 1644 and ordained a priest on 1 February 1688.
On 14 June 1688, he was appointed during the papacy of Pope Innocent XI as Archbishop of Corfu.
On 27 June 1688, he was consecrated bishop by Gasparo Carpegna, Cardinal-Priest of San Silvestro in Capite, with Stephanus Cosimi, Archbishop of Split, and Pier Antonio Capobianco, Bishop Emeritus of Lacedonia serving as co-consecrators.
He served as Archbishop of Corfù until his death in January 1705.

References

External links and additional sources
 (for Chronology of Bishops) 
 (for Chronology of Bishops) 

17th-century Roman Catholic archbishops in the Republic of Venice
18th-century Roman Catholic archbishops in the Republic of Venice
Bishops appointed by Pope Innocent XI
1644 births
1705 deaths